= Lordlings of Yore =

1983 video game

- Publisher(s): Softlore Corporation
- Platform(s): Apple II
- Release: 1983
- Genre(s): Turn-based strategy

Lordlings of Yore is an Apple II video game published by Softlore Corporation in 1983.

== Gameplay ==
Lordlings of Yore is a game in which the player is the lord of a shire who must manage knights and wealth, and eliminate opposing lords in a game involving strategy, tactics, and diplomacy.

== Reception ==
Computer Gaming World reviewed the game and stated that "The graphic presentation of the game is excellent and overall I found the game enjoyable. There are enough alternatives and actions in this game to continue to make it interesting to play over and over again."

In a retrospective review of Lordlings of Yore in Black Gate, John ONeill said "Lordlings of Yore had a lot of promise, but I can only conjecture it was an abysmal failure as a commercial release."
